Mauretania Caesariensis (Latin for "Caesarean Mauretania") was a Roman province located in what is now Algeria in the Maghreb. The full name refers to its capital Caesarea Mauretaniae (modern Cherchell).

The province had been part of the Kingdom of Mauretania and named for the Mauri people who lived there.  Formerly an independent kingdom, and later a client state of Rome, it was annexed into the Empire formally during the reign of Claudius and divided into two provinces about 42 AD.  A third province, named Mauretania Sitifensis, was later split off from the eastern portion during the reign of Diocletian in 293 AD.  During and after the Fall of the Western Roman Empire in the 5th century, most of the hinterland area was lost, first to the Vandal Kingdom and later to the Mauro-Roman Kingdom, with Roman administration limited to the capital of Caesarea.  The land was reconquered by Rome during the reign of Justinian.  This province was a part of Praetorian prefecture of Africa, later Exarchate of Africa.  The Muslim conquest of the Maghreb brought an end to Roman rule in Mauretania, permanently this time, which became ruled by the Umayyad Caliphate as part of Medieval Muslim Algeria.

History 

In the middle of 1st century AD, Roman emperor Claudius divided the westernmost Roman province in Africa, named Mauretania (land of the Mauri people, hence the word Moors), into Mauretania Caesariensis (named after its capital, one of many cities simply named Caesarea  after the imperial cognomen that had become a title) and Mauretania Tingitana.

Mauretania Caesariensis included eight colonies founded by the Emperor Augustus: Cartennas, Gunugu, Igilgili, Rusguniae, Rusazu, Saldae, Zuccabar, Tubusuctu; two by the Emperor Claudius: Caesarea formerly  the capital of Juba, who gave it this name in honour of his patron Augustus, and Oppidum Novum; one by the Emperor Nerva: Setifis; and in later times, Arsenaria, Bida, Siga, Aquae Calidae, Quiza Xenitana, Rusucurru, Auzia, Gilva, Icosium and Tipasa in all 21 well-known colonies, besides several municipia and oppida Latina.

Under Diocletian's Tetrarchy reform, the easternmost part was broken off from Mauretania Caesariensis as a separate small province, Mauretania Sitifensis, called after its inland capital Sitifis (now Sétif) with a significant port at Saldae (presently Béjaïa).

At the time of Diocletian and Constantine the Great, both Sitifensis and Caesariensis were assigned to the administrative Diocese of Africa, under the Praetorian prefecture of Italy, while Tingitana belonged to the Diocese of Hispania under the Praetorian prefecture of Gaul, so it was an enclave separate from the European territory of Diocese and Prefecture it belonged to.

After the fall of the Western Roman Empire, a Germanic Vandal Kingdom was founded, but the remaining Eastern Empire (now known to historians as the Byzantine Empire) recaptured the area around 533, but most of Mauretania Caesariensis remained under the control of local Moorish rulers such as Mastigas, and it was not until the 560s and 570s that Byzantine control was established inland.

During the reign of Maurice, the empire was reorganized and a number of Exarchates were founded, among them the Exarchate of Africa which included Mauretania, among other territories.  Mauretania Sitifensis was re-merged back into this province, and was granted the name "Mauretania Prima".

The Muslim conquest of the Maghreb for the caliphate under the Umayyad dynasty meant the end of the Byzantine Exarchate of Africa and Late Antique Roman culture there and Mauretania Caesariensis became part of the westernmost Islamic province called Maghreb.

Economy 
The principal exports from Caesariensis were purple dyes and valuable woods; and the Amazigh or Mauri were highly regarded by the Romans as soldiers, especially light cavalry. They produced one of Trajan's best generals, Lusius Quietus, and the emperor Macrinus.

Religion 

Caesarea was a major center of Judaism before 330, and Sitifis was one of the centres of the soldier cult of Mithraic mysteries. Christianity spread throughout in the 4th and 5th centuries.

Among the ruling class, Trinitarian Christianity was replaced by Arianism under the Germanic kingdom of the Vandals, which was established in 430, when the Vandals crossed the Strait of Gibraltar.

Episcopal sees 
Ancient episcopal sees of Mauretania Caesariensis listed in the Annuario Pontificio as titular sees:
{{columns-list|colwidth=30em|
 Ala Miliaria (Beniane)
 Albulae
 Altava (Ouled Mimoun, Hadjar-Er-Roum)
 Amaura (Amourah)
 Ambia (near Hammam-Bou-Hanifia)
 Aquae in Mauretania (Hammam Righa District)
 Aquae Sirenses (ruins at Hammam-Bou-Hanifia)
 Arena (Bou-Saada?)
 Arsennaria (Bou-Râs?)
 Auzia (Aumale, Sour-Khazlam)
 Bacanaria
 Baliana (L'Hillil?)
 Bapara (near the promontory of Ksila?)
 Benepota
 Bida (ruins of Djemâa-Sahridj?)
 'Caesarea in Mauretania (now Cherchell), the Metropolitan Archbishopric
 Caltadria
 Capra
 Caput Cilla (ruins of El-Gouéa?)
 Cartennae
 Castellum Ripae (ruins of Hadjar-Ouaghef?)
 Castellum Tatroportus
 Castellum Tingitii (Al Asnam)
 Castellum Iabar
 Castellum Medianum
 Castellum Minus (Coléa, near Algiers)
 Castra Nova (Mohammadia)
 Castra Severiana (Lalla Marnia? Chanzy, Sidi-Ali-Ben-Joub?)
 Catabum Castra (Saint-Aimé, Djidioua?)
 Catrum
 Catula (Oued Damous?)
 Cenae (Kenais Islands)
 Cissi (Djinet)
 Columnata (Khemisti)
 Corniculana
 Elephantaria in Mauretania (ruins at (El) Harrach)
 Fallaba (Djelfa?)
 Fidoloma
 Flenucleta
 Floriana, Mauritania (Letourneux, Derrag?)
 Flumenzer (Bou Medfa)
 Fronta
 Giru Mons (ruins of Yerroum?)
 Gratianopolis
 Gunugus (Sidi-Brahim)   
 Gypsaria (Honeïn)
 Ida in Mauretania
 Igilgilli (in the valley of Bou-Sellam?) 
 Iomnium (port at Tzigiri)
 Ita 
 Iunca in Mauretania
 Lamdia (Médéa)
 Lari Castellum (Imilaën)
 Maiuca
 Malliana (Khemis Miliana)
 Manaccenser (in the region of Cherchell)
 Masuccaba
 Maturba
 Maura (Douelt-Zerga?)
 Mauriana
 Maxita (in the region of Al-Asnam?)
 Media
 Mina (ruins near Rezilane)
 Muteci (near Aïn-El-Anab?)
 Nabala
 Nasbinca
 Noba
 Novica (ruins of Aïn-Nouïssy?)
 Numida (in the territory of Amoura, cfr supra Amaura)
 Obbi, Mauretania
 Obori (Sidi Fredj)
 Oppidum Novum (Aïn Defla)
 Panatoria
 Pomaria (Tlemcen)
 Rapidum (Masqueray, Sour-Djouab)
 Regiae (Arbal)
 Reperi
 Rusada (Azeffoun)
 Rusguniae (Tamentfoust)
 Rusubbicari (Mers El Hadjadj)
 Rusubisir (in the territory of Tiza)
 Rusuccuru
 Satafi
 Sereddeli
 
 
 Sfasferia
 Siccesi (ruins of Takembrit)
 Sinnada in Mauretania (ruins of Kenada?)
 Sita (in the west of the province
 Subbar
 Sufar
 Sufasar (Amourah)
 Summula
 Tabaicara
 Tabla (Tablat?, Tablast?)
 Taborenta (ruins near Saida?)
 Tabunia
 Tamada (Aïn-Tamda near Masqueray?)
 Tamazuca (ruins of Grimidi?)
 Tanaramusa (Mousaïaville, El-Hadjeab? Berrouaghia?)
 Tasaccora (Sigi)
 Tatilti (Souk El Khemis)
 Tigamibena
 Tigava (El-Kherba)
 Tigisis (between Dellys and Taourga)
 Timici (Timsionin?)
 Timidana
 Tingaria (Tiaret?)
 Tipasa in Mauretania
 Tubia (ruins of Henchir-Toubia?)
 Tubunae in Mauretania
 Turris in Mauretania
 Tuscamia
 Ubaba
 Usinaza (Seneg)
 Vagal, Mauritania (near the ruins of Sidi-Ben-Thiour)
 Vanariona (ruins of Ksar-Tyr?)
 Vannida
 Vardimissa (near Medjana)
 Villa Nova, Mauritania
 Vissalsa (on the Oued-Melah river?)
 Voncaria (ruins of Boghar?)
 Voncariana (near the ruins of Boghasi?)
 Vulturia (ruins at the Falco promontory?)
 Zucchabar
}}

 See also 
 Notitia Dignitatum

 References 

 Sources 
 Westermann, Großer Atlas zur Weltgschichte'' (in German)

 
Roman provinces in Africa
Ancient Algeria
Late Roman provinces
Provinces of the Byzantine Empire
States and territories established in the 40s
40s establishments in the Roman Empire
7th-century disestablishments in the Exarchate of Africa